For the history of the Jews in East Africa see:.

 History of the Jews in Kenya 
 History of the Jews in Uganda 
 History of the Jews in Djibouti
 History of the Jews in Eritrea 
 History of the Jews in Ethiopia 
 History of the Jews in Somalia

See also
Many of the following articles relate to Jewish history in East Africa:

 History of the Jews in Madagascar
 History of the Jews in Malawi 
 History of the Jews in Zambia 
 History of the Jews in Zimbabwe 
 History of the Jews in Egypt 
 History of the Jews in Sudan